Cladiella variabilis is a species of coral. It has been recorded in the Gulf of Suez.

References 

Alcyoniidae